The Canon EOS 50D is a 15.1-megapixel digital single-lens reflex camera.  It is part of the Canon EOS line of cameras, succeeding the EOS 40D and preceding the EOS 60D.

Canon announced the camera on 26 August 2008. The camera was released on 6 October 2008.

Overview and features
The 50D has many similar characteristics to its predecessor, the 40D. This includes various shooting modes, the ability to change ISO and white balance, a pop-up flash unit, and an LCD screen. The LCD screen is the same size (3.0") as the 40D but has a higher resolution (640 × 480 pixel or 307,200 pixels) than any previous model. It is also the final Canon xxD to use a CompactFlash or Microdrive for memory storage, along with the BP-511 series battery.

The 50D has a higher pixel count (15.1 megapixels), hence higher shooting resolutions, than its predecessor and, like the 40D, has a 14-bit raw format.

The camera has Live View, which allows photographers to use the LCD screen as the viewfinder. Because the sensor mirror needs to be in the locked position (see Live preview), shutter noise is reduced in this mode.
 15.1 megapixel APS-C CMOS sensor
 3.0 inch VGA LCD monitor
 LiveView mode
 Wide 9-point AF with center cross-type sensors
 Selectable AF and metering modes
 Built-in flash
 Canon EOS Integrated Cleaning System
 ISO 100–3200 (6400 and 12800 with custom function)
 Auto correction of vignetting
 Continuous Drive up to 6.3 fps (90 images (JPEG), 16 images (raw))
 DIGIC 4 image processor
 Canon EF/EF-S Lenses
 Canon EX Speedlites
 PAL/NTSC/HDMI video output
 File Formats include: JPEG, raw, sRAW1 (7.1 MP) and sRAW2 (3.8 MP)
 Raw and JPEG simultaneous recording
 USB 2.0 computer interface
 BP-511/BP-511A or BP-512/BP-514 Battery Types (BP-511A battery supplied)
 Dimensions 146 × 108 × 74 mm (5.7 × 4.2 × 2.9 in)
 Approx weight 
 Retail price at time of release $1399 (body only)

Improvements

Changes over the 40D include a higher-resolution sensor (15.1 megapixel instead of 10.1 megapixel).

The ISO goes up to 3200 in standard mode, and can be increased to 12800 through the use of a custom function. The burst rate is the same as on the 40D, 6.3 frames per second, though the 40D was advertised as 6.5.

The camera uses Canon's DIGIC 4 image processor. The processor delivers more responsive operation, improved color rendition and near-instant start-up time. A new sensor cleaning system has also been introduced. The camera can also use the Canon Wireless File Transmitter WFT-E3/E3A.

The 50D has a 3" screen – the same size as the 40D – but the resolution is 640×480 pixels, which allows it to show more image detail than any of Canon's previous 3" LCD displays. The 50D features two new Autofocus Modes in Liveview and an HDMI port.

The 50D was offered as a body only or in a package with a new EF-S 18-200mm 3.5-5.6 IS lens or EF 28–135 3.5-5.6 IS USM lens.

Image quality and noise
The 50D adds 5 megapixels to an APS-C sized sensor (compared to the 40D), and as a result the size of the individual photosensors has decreased. To offset the increased noise that inevitably results from smaller photosensors, Canon eliminated the gaps between the microlenses covering the photosensors. Thus the microlenses are larger, and capture more light and direct it to the sensor sites.

Reception
The Canon EOS 50D received generally favourable reviews. Digital Photography Review concluded: "Looking at the specification differences between the EOS 40D and our test candidate it appears you pay quite a premium for the 50D's extra megapixels and as we've found out during this review you don't get an awful lot of extra image quality for your money. The Canon EOS 50D still earns itself our highest reward but considering its price point and our slight concerns about its pixel-packed sensor, it only does so by a whisker." Gordon Laing of CameraLabs.com had a slightly better view of the camera, noting that "Canon’s bold claims of matching the noise levels of the earlier EOS 40D were confirmed in our High ISO tests," and concluded by calling it "a very capable DSLR that handles confidently, delivers great results and is a joy to use. . . .[but] to exploit that high resolution you’ll need to couple it with a decent quality lens."

Magic Lantern video 
As of 2013, there has been Magic Lantern development of 50D video support. The 50D compares favorably to many later Canon APS-C models in terms of light sensitivity: "The camera is also a totally unbelievable low light performer. The 50D was designed before the megapixel race really took off. It has a 15MP APS-C sensor, so individual pixels are much larger than those on the later 18MP Rebel CMOS sensors.". In addition to raw video, the Magic Lantern firmware add-on also enabled high bitrate compressed H.264 video at 30 frames per second. Other publications, while impressed, pointed out downsides such as no audio, expensive fast CF-cards and no Canon support for Magic Lantern firmware.

References

External links

 Canon EOS 50D – Canon USA website
 Canon EOS 50D – EOS website Japan

50D
Live-preview digital cameras